General elections were held in Romania between 25 and 27 May 1920. The result was a victory for the governing People's Party, which won 206 of the 366 seats in the Chamber of Deputies and 124 of the 166 seats in the Senate.

Results

Chamber of Deputies

Senate

References

Parliamentary elections in Romania
Romania
1920 in Romania
Romania
Election and referendum articles with incomplete results
1920 elections in Romania